is a district of Setagaya, Tokyo, Japan.

Education

Setagaya Board of Education operates public elementary and junior high schools.

Kasuya 1-2 and 4-chome are zoned to Roka Elementary School (芦花小学校) and Roka Junior High School (芦花中学校). 3-chome is zoned to Tsukado Elementary School (塚戸小学校) and Chitose Junior High School (千歳中学校).

References

Districts of Setagaya